Thrifton is an unincorporated community in Ross County, in the U.S. state of Ohio.

History
Thrifton was founded when the railroad was extended through the neighborhood. A post office called Thrifton was established in 1889, and remained in operation until 1891.

References

Unincorporated communities in Ross County, Ohio
Unincorporated communities in Ohio